Rumex conglomeratus, known as clustered dock and sharp dock, is a plant of the family Polygonaceae.  It is an annual or biennial plant growing up to 100 cm high. A native of Europe, Asia and North Africa, it has also been introduced into North America.

References

External links
 
 
 
 
 Jepson Manual Treatment (invasive plant species)

conglomeratus
Flora of Europe
Flora of North Africa
Flora of temperate Asia